Silvan Eli Sidler (born 7 July 1998) is a Swiss professional footballer who plays as a left-back for German  club Arminia Bielefeld.

Career
Sidler made his professional debut for Luzern in a 3–0 Swiss Super League win over St. Gallen on 5 November 2017.

In June 2022, 2. Bundesliga club Arminia Bielefeld announced the signing of Sidler until 2025.

References

External links
 
 
 UEFA Profile
 SFL Profile

1998 births
Living people
Sportspeople from Lucerne
Swiss men's footballers
Switzerland under-21 international footballers
Association football fullbacks
FC Luzern players
Arminia Bielefeld players
Swiss Super League players
2. Bundesliga players
Swiss expatriate footballers
Expatriate footballers in Germany
Swiss expatriate sportspeople in Germany